In differential geometry, Catalan's minimal surface is a minimal surface originally studied by Eugène Charles Catalan in 1855.

It has the special property of being the minimal surface that contains a cycloid as a geodesic. It is also swept out by a family of parabolae.

The surface has the mathematical characteristics exemplified by the following parametric equation:

External links 
  Weisstein, Eric W. "Catalan's Surface." From MathWorld—A Wolfram Web Resource. http://mathworld.wolfram.com/CatalansSurface.html
  Weiqing Gu, The Library of Surfaces. https://web.archive.org/web/20130317011222/http://www.math.hmc.edu/~gu/curves_and_surfaces/surfaces/catalan.html

References

Minimal surfaces
Differential geometry